JPJ may refer to:

 Jalalpur Jattan, a city in Punjab, Pakistan
 John Paul Jackson (1950-2015), American author, teacher, conference speaker and founder of Streams Ministries International
 John Paul Jones (1747–1792), Scottish sailor known for his service in the American and Russian navies
 John Paul Jones (musician) (born 1946), English musician
 John Paul Jones Arena, in Charlottesville, Virginia, United States
 Malaysian Road Transport Department
 , several United States Navy vessels